AK Trolls are state-sponsored anonymous political commentators and trolls on the internet, as well as recruited TUGVA (Turkey Youth Foundation) members by the Justice and Development Party (AKP), the current government of Turkey. In 2015, it was confirmed that AK Trolls are directly funded by the state, with most of the state-sponsored Internet trolls being people aged 20–25. The youth wing of the Justice and Development Party (AK Gençlik) is presumed responsible for heading the web brigade. In 2020 Twitter Safety suspended and archived 7,340 accounts pushing Justice and Development Party (AKP) which consists of fake and compromised accounts that are tied to the group which pushed pro-AKP narratives that aim to increase domestic support for Turkish intervention in Syria as well as narratives critical of opposition parties CHP, IYI Party and HDP.

Background
AK Trolls came to existence in 2013 after the Gezi Park protests where protesters used social media to organize and publicize protests against the government and the authoritarian tendencies of Recep Tayyip Erdoğan. As a reaction, the AKP recruited 6,000 people to a new social media team, known as the New Turkey Digital Office, to promote state propaganda and orchestrate campaigns against individuals identified as being opponents of AKP. Internet bots are extensively used by government as well to assist paid individuals. AK Trolls mainly target anyone who opposes the policies of incumbent President Erdoğan, which can range from Kurdish nationalists to Kemalists.

AK Trolls favored a 'Yes' vote for the constitutional changes sought by Erdoğan.

2020 Twitter takedown

Twitter safety statement:  "Based on our analysis of the network’s technical indicators and account behaviors, the collection of fake and compromised accounts was being used to amplify political narratives favorable to the AK Parti, and demonstrated strong support for President Erdogan. We’re disclosing 7,340 accounts to the archive today."

According to Stanford Internet Observatory's report, the accounts:

 consisted of "batches of fabricated personalities, all created on the same day, with similar usernames..."
 "included centrally managed compromised accounts that were used for AKP cheerleading..."
 "some were linked to organizations that were critical of the government. According to Twitter, they are included in the takedown because their accounts were compromised by this network."
 "Tweets were critical of the Peoples’ Democratic Party (HDP), and accused it of terrorism and social media ploys. Tweets were also critical of the Republican People's Party (CHP)."
 "Tweets promoted the 2017 Turkish constitutional referendum, which consolidated power in Turkish President Recep Tayyip Erdoğan."
 "Tweets worked to increase domestic support for Turkish intervention in Syria. There were also English-language tweets that attempted to increase the external legitimacy of Turkey’s offensive in northeastern Syria in October 2019."

Methods
AK Trolls use social media networks (i.e. Facebook, Twitter, Ekşi Sözlük) in an organized way to promote the AKP, discredit opposition, and attack individuals by spreading false information about them on the Internet. MPs from CHP and HDP asked to start an investigation on AK Trolls as the group is extensively employed to silence individuals through character assassination, insults, and threats. AK Trolls also use images to incite emotional responses from the target population. 

AK Trolls use fake Twitter trends as a means to launch campaigns against opposition. A study by Swiss Federal Institute of Technology in Lausanne (EPFL) found that at least 47% of Twitter trends in Turkey were fake, created automatically using fake and compromised accounts. It is reported that in 2019, there were 6500 fake trends. Of those, 802 were about politics and 472 were pro-AKP, including campaigns against Ekrem İmamoğlu such as #ÇünküÇaldılar which claims that Ekrem İmamoğlu stole the votes.

See also

50 Cent Army
Internet Water Army
Public opinion brigades
State-sponsored Internet propaganda
Trolls from Olgino
Russian web brigades

References

Justice and Development Party (Turkey)
Internet manipulation and propaganda
Internet trolling
Recep Tayyip Erdoğan controversies